Joanne Dudziak (born 8 June 1972 in Strasbourg) is a French handball goalkeeper. She has played for the Club HBC Nîmes and for the French national team.

She became World Champion in 2003, when France won the 2003 World Women's Handball Championship in Croatia.

She represented France at the 2000 Summer Olympics in Sydney, when France placed 6th, and at the 2004 Summer Olympics in Athens, where the French team placed 4th.

References

External links

1972 births
Living people
French female handball players
Olympic handball players of France
Handball players at the 2000 Summer Olympics
Handball players at the 2004 Summer Olympics
Sportspeople from Strasbourg
French people of Polish descent